Park Sang-in (born 15 November 1952) is a former South Korean footballer and football manager who manages Korea National League club Busan Transportation Corporation. His sons Park Hyuk-soon and Park Seung-min are also footballers.

Career

Player career

Park began his career at Changnyeong Middle School at the age of 13. He went through Dongnae High School, graduating in 1972. In the same year he joined the Commercial Bank of Korea. One year later, he joined the army in order to fulfil his military service.

In 1981, he had trials for Dutch club, Feyenoord, receiving a favorable response from the club. However, the contract foundered due to an objection of the player's labor union. In July 1981, he signed a contract with Bundesliga club MSV Duisburg for 1 year. He played only two league games though, due to a thigh injury.

He returned to South Korea and joined Hallelujah FC. He lifted the first championship of the K League with Hallelujah FC in 1983. He then went on to play for Hyundai Horang-i from 1986 to 1987.

Manager career
After retiring from club football, he was appointed as his alma mater's football team manager from 1988 to 2001. In the middle of the term, in 1992–1993, he managed the South Korea U20 team, going to the 1993 FIFA World Youth Championship. The South Korean youth team finished unbeaten, with three draws. From 2006, he has managed newly formed Busan Transportation Corporation. In 2009, he went to the 2009 East Asian Games as the South Korea team manager.

Honours

Player
ROK Army
 Korea Football League
 Champions: 1974 Autumn
 Runners-up: 1973 Autumn, 1975 Spring
 Korean President's Cup Champions: 1975 
 Korean National Football Championship Champions: 1975

Hallelujah FC
 K League Champions: 1983

National Team
 Asian Games Champions: 1978
 Korea Cup Champions: 1976, 1978
 King's Cup Champions: 1975
 Merdeka Tournament Champions: 1977

Individual
 Korean National Football Championship MVP: 1975
 K-League Best XI: 1985

Manager
Busan Transportation Corporation 
 National League Cup Champions: 2010

References

External links
 K-League Legend - Park Sang-in
 
  
 
 

1952 births
Living people
Association football midfielders
South Korean footballers
South Korea international footballers
South Korean expatriate footballers
Hallelujah FC players
Ulsan Hyundai FC players
K League 1 players
MSV Duisburg players
Busan Transportation Corporation FC managers
Bundesliga players
Expatriate footballers in Germany
Sportspeople from South Gyeongsang Province
South Korean expatriate sportspeople in Germany
Asian Games gold medalists for South Korea
Medalists at the 1978 Asian Games
Asian Games medalists in football
People from Changnyeong County
Footballers at the 1978 Asian Games